"Whiskey" is a song recorded by American band Maroon 5 featuring American rapper ASAP Rocky. It was released on October 20, 2017, as the second promotional single from the band's sixth studio album Red Pill Blues (2017). The song was written by Adam Levine, Rakim Mayers, John Ryan, Jacob Kasher Hindlin, and Tinashe Sibanda and was produced by John Ryan, Maxime Devaux and JKash.

Composition 
"Whiskey" has a duration of three minutes and 30 seconds, and was written and composed by Maroon 5 frontman Adam Levine, Rakim Mayers, John Ryan, Jacob Kasher Hindlin, Maxime Devaux (Fly-M) and Tinashe Sibanda. Production was handled by John Ryan and JKash and features American rapper ASAP Rocky. The track was recorded in June 2017 at Conway Recording Studios in Los Angeles, California.

Credits and personnel 
Maroon 5

Adam Levine – lead vocals, rhythm guitar, songwriting, executive production
Jesse Carmichael – keyboards, synthesizers, rhythm guitar, backing vocals
Mickey Madden – bass
James Valentine – lead guitar, backing vocals
Matt Flynn – drums, percussion, electronic drums
PJ Morton – keyboards, synthesizers, piano, backing vocals
Sam Farrar – rhythm guitar, keyboards, synthesizers, samples, bass, backing vocals, programming, production

Additional Personnel
 ASAP Rocky – guest artist and songwriter
 John Ryan – producer, songwriter, keyboards, piano, synthesizer
 Jacob "JKash" Kasher Hindlin – producer, songwriter
Fly-M  – producer, disc jockey
 Tinashe Sibanda – songwriter, composer
 Noah "Mailbox" Passovoy – engineer
 Serban Ghenea – mixing engineer
 Tom Coyne – mastering

Recording
 Recorded at Conway Recording Studios, Los Angeles, California

Charts

References 

2017 singles
2017 songs
Maroon 5 songs
ASAP Rocky songs
Songs written by Adam Levine
Songs written by ASAP Rocky
Songs written by Jacob Kasher
Songs written by John Ryan (musician)
Songs written by Tinashe Sibanda
Torch songs
Songs about alcohol
222 Records singles
Interscope Records singles